Spring Creek is a  tributary of Little Lehigh Creek in the Lehigh Valley region of eastern Pennsylvania.

It is formed by the confluences of Schaefer Run and Iron Run at Mosser Spring near Trexlertown. Spring Creek joins Little Lehigh Creek several miles upstream from Emmaus in Lehigh County.

Tributaries
Schaefer Run
Iron Run

See also
List of rivers of Pennsylvania

References

Tributaries of the Lehigh River
Rivers of Pennsylvania
Rivers of Lehigh County, Pennsylvania